Isaiah or Isiah Thomas may refer to:

Sportsmen
 Isiah Thomas (born 1961), American retired Hall of Fame basketball player and coach
 Isaiah Thomas (basketball) (born 1989), American basketball player 
 Isiah Thomas (boxer) (born 1989), American boxer
 Isaiah Thomas (American football) (born 1998), American football player

Other people
 Isaiah Thomas (publisher) (1749–1831), American revolutionary-era publisher and author
 Isaiah Thomas (politician) (born 1984), American politician